Brijinder Nath Goswamy is an Indian art critic, art historian and a former vice chairman of the Sarabhai Foundation of Ahmedabad, which runs the Calico Museum of Textiles. Goswamy is best known for his scholarship on Pahari painting and Indian miniature paintings. He is the author of over 20 books on arts and culture, including Sakti Burman: A Private Universe, a monograph on the life and works of Sakti Burman, renowned Bengali painter and Masters of Indian Painting 1100-1900, a treatise on Indian miniature art. The Government of India awarded him the fourth highest civilian award of the Padma Shri in 1998 and followed it up with the third highest honour of the Padma Bhushan in 2008.

Biography

Goswamy was born on 15 August 1933 at Sargodha of the Punjab province (presently in Pakistan) of British India, to B.L. Goswamy, a District and Sessions Judge. After the early schooling at various schools in the province, he did his intermediate studies at the Hindu College, Amritsar and secured his master's degree from Punjab University, Chandigarh in 1954. He joined the Indian Administrative Service in 1956 and after working in the Bihar cadre for two years, he resigned from the service in 1958 to continue his studies in art. He returned to Punjab University and did research on Kangra painting and its social backdrop, under the guidance of the renowned historian,  Hari Ram Gupta, to obtain a doctoral degree (PhD) in 1961. It is reported that his examiners were Arthur Llewellyn Basham, the Indologist, and the art critic, W.G. Archer.

During the course of his research, he joined Punjab University as a member of its faculty of Art History, where he would spend his entire career and eventually superannuate as a professor. While working there, he took a break and worked as a visiting professor at the South Asian Institute of the University of Heidelberg from 1973 till 1981. He also served as a visiting professor at various other international universities such as California, Berkeley, Pennsylvania and Zurich. At Punjab University, he developed the Museum of Fine Arts, as its director, and the museum holds 1200 creations of contemporary Indian art. Besides his academic career, he served as the vice chairman of the Centre for Cultural Resources and Training (CCRT), a nodal agency under the Government of India providing training to educators who are involved in educational programmes on Indian culture. He has been a member of the Governing Committee of the Indian Council of Historical Research (ICHR) and has chaired the Chandigarh Lalit Kala Akademi.

Goswamy is married to Karuna, an art historian, academic, and a former professor of Punjab University. The couple has one son and one daughter, Apurva and Malavika. He lives in Chandigarh, India.

Legacy
Goswamy is considered by many as one of the most prominent scholars of Indian miniature painting. He is known to have specialised knowledge of Pahari painting, a genre of traditional miniature painting originated in the hills of Punjab region. His 1968 article, Pahari Painting: The Family as the Basis of Style, is a study of this genre, where he is reported to have been successful in unearthing the genealogy of renowned miniaturists such as Pandit Seu, Nainsukh and Manaku. He published five books on this topic, Nainsukh of Guler: A Great Indian Painter from a Small Hill-State, Pahari Masters: Court Painters of Northern India Painters at the Sikh Court, Essence of Indian Art and Masters of Indian Painting 1100-1900. Collaborating with Eberhard Fischer, the Padma Shri winning Swiss-based German art historian and the co-author of a few of his books, he has staged a series of shows, under the title, Wonder of the Age, in many parts of the world.

His work, The Spirit of Indian Painting: Close Encounters with 101 Great Works, 1100-1900 is a treatise on selected creations from Jain manuscripts to Indian miniatures. He has published 20 books to date, apart from several articles he has published in Indian and international journals and magazines. A Jainesque Sultanate Shahnama and the context of pre-Mughal painting in India, A Place Apart: Painting in Kutch, 1720-1820, Painted visions: The Goenka collection of Indian paintings, Ranga Roopa Gods, Words, Images, The Word is Sacred, Sacred is the Word: The Indian Manuscript Tradition, Domains of Wonder: Selected Masterworks of Indian Painting and I See No Stranger: Sikh Early Art and Devotion, are some of his other notable books. A Layered World is a 40,000-word audio-visual presentation prepared by Goswamy for Chandigarh Lalit Kala Akademi. He also writes a regular column in The Tribune, titled Art n Soul and delivers keynote addresses and lectures, in India and abroad.

Awards and honours
When Goswamy retired from his academic career, Punjab University made him the Emeritus Professor. He held the Jawaharlal Nehru Fellowship from 1969 to 1970   and the Sarabhai Fellowship in 1994. He was also a Mellon Senior Fellow of the National Humanities Center, North Carolina. The Government of India awarded him the civilian honour of the Padma Shri in 1998. He was again included in the Republic Day Honours list in 2008, this time for the third highest honour of the Padma Bhushan.

Selected bibliography

See also

 Calico Museum of Textiles
 Eberhard Fischer
 Sakti Burman
 Arthur Llewellyn Basham
 Nainsukh

References

External links
 
 
The Art of Seeing: BN Goswamy illuminates a lost world of Indian painting. http://www.caravanmagazine.in/reviews-and-essays/art-seeing

1933 births
Living people
People from Sargodha District
Panjab University alumni
Indian Administrative Service officers
Indian art critics
Indian art historians
Indian male writers
Recipients of the Padma Shri in literature & education
Recipients of the Padma Bhushan in literature & education
Jawaharlal Nehru Fellows
Writers from Chandigarh
20th-century Indian historians
Scientists from Chandigarh
Historians of Indian art
Academic staff of Panjab University